There are over 9000 Grade I listed buildings in England.  This page is a list of these buildings in the county of Worcestershire, by district.

Bromsgrove

|}

Malvern Hills

|}

Redditch

|}

Worcester

|}

Wychavon

|}

Wyre Forest

|}

See also
:Category:Grade I listed buildings in Worcestershire

Notes

References 
National Heritage List for England

External links

 
Worcestershire
Lists of listed buildings in Worcestershire